Andrija Filipović (born 18 April 1997) is a Croatian professional footballer who plays as a forward for Aktobe.

Club career
Born in Rijeka, Filipović played football at a youth level with HNK Rijeka before joining the youth team of Juventus in 2015 on a temporary basis. Spells with Spezia Calcio and Siena followed, before joining Slovenian side ND Gorica in February 2017 on a deal until the end of the 2019–20 season After making 62 league appearances with Gorica, scoring 11, Filipović joined Eerste Divisie side NAC Breda in the summer of 2019, signing a two-year contract with the club, with the option for a further year. After 15 appearances with Breda, scoring once, he joined Slovenian side NŠ Mura on a two-year contract on 31 January 2020, lasting until the end of 2022. However, his contract was mutually terminated in August 2021.

In September 2021, Filipović signed for Albanian club FK Partizani on a three-year contract. He left the club at the end of the calendar year, having scored twice in 10 matches in all competitions.

In February 2022, Filipović signed for Kazakhstan Premier League club FC Atyrau.

On 13 February 2023, Filipović signed for fellow Kazakhstan Premier League club Aktobe.

International career
Filipović appeared for the Croatian under-19 team in a 3–1 UEFA under-19 EURO qualification match against Montenegro in 2015.

Honours
Mura
Slovenian PrvaLiga: 2020–21
Slovenian Cup: 2019–20

References

External links
 
 Andrija Filipović at HNS 

1997 births
Living people
Croatian footballers
Footballers from Rijeka
Croatia youth international footballers
Croatian expatriate footballers
Association football forwards
A.C.N. Siena 1904 players
ND Gorica players
NAC Breda players
NŠ Mura players
FK Partizani Tirana players
FC Atyrau players
FC Aktobe players
Slovenian PrvaLiga players
Eerste Divisie players
Kategoria Superiore players
Kazakhstan Premier League players
Expatriate footballers in Italy
Croatian expatriate sportspeople in Italy
Expatriate footballers in Slovenia
Croatian expatriate sportspeople in Slovenia
Expatriate footballers in the Netherlands
Croatian expatriate sportspeople in the Netherlands
Expatriate footballers in Albania
Croatian expatriate sportspeople in Albania
Expatriate footballers in Kazakhstan
Croatian expatriate sportspeople in Kazakhstan